The Flores crow (Corvus florensis) is a species of bird in the family Corvidae.
It is endemic to Indonesia.

Its natural habitats are subtropical or tropical dry forest and subtropical or tropical moist lowland forest. It is threatened by habitat loss.

References

Flores crow
Birds of Flores
Flores crow
Flores crow
Taxonomy articles created by Polbot